"Don't Wanna Live Inside Myself" is a ballad written and sung by Barry Gibb, and released on the Bee Gees' album Trafalgar in 1971, and the second single release taken from the album.

Recording and release
This slow dramatic piano ballad was described by Robin Gibb in the liner notes of Tales from the Brothers Gibb box set as "...the dawning, or the closing, of the 'gotta find out who I really am' era." This track was the last song recorded for the album. "Don't Wanna Live Inside Myself" was recorded on April 7, the same day when they finished the tracks "Israel", "It's Just the Way" and "Engines, Aeroplanes".

The single was released in October 1971, two months after the number 1 hit "How Can You Mend a Broken Heart". Considering that "How Can You Mend a Broken Heart" was a number 1, it was surprising that this did not even make the top fifty.  Cash Box said of it that it was "another classic outing from the Brothers Gibb certain to trigger off a mighty sales explosion" and repeat the chart success of "How Can You Mend a Broken Heart. With the success of "...Broken Heart", Atco Records was choosing ballads exclusively for Bee Gees singles during this time. This song along with "Walking Back to Waterloo" was released as a double A-side in Spain, Canada, Japan and the US. The album version of the song was faded at 5:24.

A promotional single issued by Atco in the US, featured the song in its mono and stereo versions on its respective sides.

Personnel
 Barry Gibb — lead vocals
 Robin Gibb - harmony vocals
 Maurice Gibb — piano, bass, harmony vocals
 Geoff Bridgford — drums
 Bill Shepherd — orchestral arrangement

Chart positions

References

1971 singles
Bee Gees songs
Songs written by Barry Gibb
Song recordings produced by Robert Stigwood
Song recordings produced by Barry Gibb
Song recordings produced by Robin Gibb
Song recordings produced by Maurice Gibb
Polydor Records singles
Atco Records singles
1971 songs
1970s ballads